The following is a list of units within the United States Army Military Police Corps, with their Distinctive unit insignia.

References

United States Army Military Police Units
Army Military Police Units
United States Army Military Police Units